Bob Carmichael defeated Allan Stone 7–6, 7–6, 6–3 to win the 1971 Benson & Hedges Centennial Open singles competition. Roger Taylor was the reigning champion but did not defend his title.

Draw

Final

Top half

Bottom half

References

ATP Auckland Open
1971 Grand Prix (tennis)